The Choir of St John's College, Cambridge is considered to be one of the finest collegiate choirs in the world. It is part of the English cathedral tradition, having been founded to sing the daily liturgy in the College Chapel, though it is set apart from other English choirs of this tradition by the frequent inclusion of Continental works in its repertoire and its emphasis on polyphonic interpretations. Alongside the choir of King's College, Cambridge, it is one of the two most famous collegiate choirs in Cambridge, having had over 90 recordings published.

The early records of the choirs are obscure, but it is known that its origins can be traced to the original foundation of the College in 1511. The present arrangement of the choir began in 1670.
 
The Choir consists of fifteen Choral Scholars and twenty Choristers and Probationers, all of whom are members of St John's College, many of whom have proceeded to become distinguished musicians.

Choir

Until 2022, the choir followed the English cathedral tradition of men and boys. In October 2021 it was announced that, from 2022, the choir would admit girls and women. Such a decision has resulted in St John's being the only Oxbridge choir to have both boys and girls singing services together.

The choristers are educated at the St John's College School, at the extreme west end of the College grounds. They travel to and from Chapel wearing a miniature version of the college's undergraduate dress — mortar boards and academic gowns (or cloaks in the winter) over their uniforms. As well as the traditional church choir ranks of head and deputy head choristers, one treble a year is awarded the George Guest medal, in memory of the former Organist. Upon leaving the choir, many choristers take up music scholarships at the country's leading independent schools.

The men and women of the choir are either undergraduates at the college or, occasionally, lay clerks (who have generally just graduated from St John's or another Cambridge college). As well as singing with the choristers, they sing one service a week on their own and all services when the choristers are on their half term holiday. They also form the a capella Gentlemen of St John's ensemble, where they also sing lighter music, and are in frequent demand for concerts, May Balls, and many other engagements; they have also recorded many CDs ranging from close-harmony to renaissance music and tour regularly around the world.

Repertoire
Services follow the tradition of the Church of England, generally consisting of a Sunday Eucharist and evensong every day except Monday. Like the other elite cathedral and collegiate choirs, the repertoire extends far beyond the core Anglican pieces. The efforts of organists over the centuries have broadened it further: Walmisley, for example (whose godfather Thomas Attwood studied under Mozart) collaborated with Felix Mendelssohn, while George Guest was a great advocate of contemporary French choral music.

Many composers have written for the choir. Herbert Howells wrote a set of evening Canticles, as did Sir Michael Tippett, who was reputedly attracted by the renowned trompeta real stop on the organ. The College continues to commission new works from contemporary composers, particularly for the Advent and Ash Wednesday services, including recently Bob Chilcott, Philip Moore, Tarik O'Regan, and Dr John Rutter.

Recordings and special events
The choir has an extensive discography, and tends to record two CDs a year. The series of recordings of English church music, recorded under Christopher Robinson and released on label Naxos Records, attracted particular critical acclaim. Under the direction of Andrew Nethsingha, who became Director of Music in 2007, the choir recorded eleven CDs with Chandos Records. In 2016 the college launched its own recording label 'St John's Cambridge', and imprint on Signum Classics.  The first release, in May 2016, was a collection of music by the contemporary composer Jonathan Harvey. This entered the specialist classical charts at number two and won five star reviews in The Observer and BBC Music Magazine as well as an Editor's Choice selection in Gramophone.  Upcoming releases include a disc of Christmas music and recordings of masses by Zoltán Kodály and Francis Poulenc.

As well as this, the choir tours extensively, gives concerts in Cambridge and beyond, and broadcasts frequently. The Advent carol service and Evensong for Ash Wednesday in particular are often broadcast by BBC Radio 3 as part of the station's regular broadcast of Choral Evensong. The choir was also the first choir in the UK to webcast its services, releasing a new webcast each week throughout the year since 2008. An archive of recent live recordings taken from these webcasts, SJC Live, was launched in November 2011.

There are occasionally special services in Chapel which add variety to its liturgical life. There is a Lent meditation, an Epiphany service with carols, and, every few months, services in which the choir is joined by another Cambridge collegiate choir. Every year, there is a joint evensong with the Choir of King's College, Cambridge; the venue alternates between King's and St John's each year.

Perhaps the most unusual tradition is the Ascension Day carol. Legend has it that, in 1902, the then Organist, Cyril Rootham was challenged to a bet that the choir could not be heard from the tower roof: the following Ascension Day, they ascended the  tower and proved this to be wrong. The tradition continues; at noon after the sung Eucharist, the congregation (and other visitors) gather in First Court to hear the choir, who, unlike Magdalen College, remain unaided by microphones.

Notable former choristers, choral and organ scholars
Andrew Carwood (choral scholar), early music performer and conductor, Director of Music St Paul's Cathedral
Allan Clayton (choral scholar), tenor
Stephen Cleobury (organ scholar), director of music at King's College
Iestyn Davies (chorister, choral scholar), International Countertenor
Ed Lyon (choral scholar), tenor
Peter Stanley Lyons (choral scholar). Tenor. Director of Music, Royal Naval College, Greenwich; Master of Choristers and Director of Music, Wells Cathedral and Wells Cathedral School; Headmaster, Witham Hall School.
Jimmy Edwards (choral scholar), comedian
Christopher Gabbitas (choral scholar), Baritone with The King's Singers
John Gostling, famous bass associated with Henry Purcell
Harry Gregson-Williams (chorister) Eminent film-score composer (Bridget Jones, Chicken Run, Shrek, Kingdom of Heaven etc.)
Ben Gummer (chorister), Member of Parliament
Robert King (chorister, choral scholar), early music performer and conductor
Simon Keenlyside (chorister, choral scholar), distinguished operatic baritone and recitalist 
 Andrew Lumsden (organ scholar), Organist & Master of the Choristers, Winchester Cathedral
Clive Mantle (chorister) Eminent in television, theatre and screen - for example "Dr Mike Barratt" in BBC 1's "Casualty"
John Margetson (choral scholar), Diplomat, organist
Robert Huw Morgan (organ scholar), University Organist of the Stanford Memorial Church
John Scott (organ scholar), director of music of St Thomas Church, New York
David Pountney (chorister), opera director

Many recent choral scholars continue to sing in professional groups. Organ scholars have led the music in St Edmundsbury, Carlisle, and Wells cathedrals. Former organ scholars George Guest, David Hill and Andrew Nethsingha have gone on to direct the choir.

Directors of Music

George Loosemore 1661
Mr Hawkins 1681
Thomas Williams 1682 
Bernard Turner 1729
William Tireman 1777
Jonathan Sharpe 1777
John Clarke Whitfeld (1799-1820) then organist Hereford Cathedral
William Beale 1820
Samuel Matthews 1821
Thomas Attwood Walmisley (1833–1856) - simultaneously organist at Trinity College
 Alfred Bennett (1856)
George Garrett (1857–1897)
 Edward Thomas Sweeting (1897-1901)
Cyril Rootham (1901–1938)
Robin Orr (1938–1951)
Herbert Howells (acting organist, 1941–1945)
George Guest (1951-1991)
Christopher Robinson (1991–2003)
David Hill (2003–2007)
Andrew Nethsingha (2007–2022)
Stephen Darlington (interim Director of Music, 2023)
Christopher Gray (2023−)

References

External links
St John's College Choir
Choir webcasts
Archived webcasts from 2007
The Gentlemen of St John's
St John's College Chapel
St John's College School

Saint Johns College
1511 establishments in England
St John's College, Cambridge
Saint Johns College Cambridge